Emil Yanchev (born 8 February 1999) is a Bulgarian footballer who plays as a midfielder for Dunav Ruse.

Career
Yanchev made his first team league début in a 0–4 away defeat against Ludogorets Razgrad on 1 May 2017, coming on as substitute for Nikolay Minkov. On 6 July 2017, he signed his first professional contract.

Career statistics

International career
Yanchev received a call-up for the Bulgaria U18 team for the friendlies against Macedonia U18 on 9 and 11 May 2017. On 12 September 2017, he made his debut for Bulgaria U19 in a friendly against Bosnia and Herzegovina U19.

References

External links
 

1999 births
Living people
Sportspeople from Varna, Bulgaria
Bulgarian footballers
Bulgaria youth international footballers
Association football midfielders
Association football defenders
PFC Cherno More Varna players
PFC Lokomotiv Plovdiv players
First Professional Football League (Bulgaria) players